Joseph Paul Taibi (born February 22, 1963) is a former American football defensive end who played one season in the National Football League (NFL) for the New York Giants. He played college football for Southern Colorado (now CSU Pueblo), Northern Colorado, and Idaho.

Early life and education
Joe Taibi was born on February 22, 1963, in Pueblo, Colorado. He attended Pueblo East High School, before accepting a scholarship offer from Southern Colorado (now CSU Pueblo). He quit his first football season at Southern Colorado after three games, transferring to Northern Colorado. Before the start of his first Northern Colorado game, he ruptured his appendix and it required three surgeries. After the season, he transferred back to Southern Colorado, but the football program was discontinued before he could play in a game. He then joined University of Idaho, appearing in the starting lineup during the 1985 season. Taibi returned to Idaho for the 1986 season.

Professional career
After going unselected in the 1987 NFL Draft, Taibi played semi-professional football for the Pueblo Crusaders. Taibi was signed by the New York Giants during the NFL Players Association strike, in which each team signed replacement players. He appeared in three games with the Giants before being released.

Taibi was inducted into the Minor League Football Hall of Fame in 2001.

References

1963 births
Living people
Players of American football from Colorado
American football defensive ends
CSU Pueblo ThunderWolves football players
Northern Colorado Bears football players
Idaho Vandals football players
New York Giants players